Camaldoli is a frazione of the comune of Poppi, in Tuscany, Italy. It is mostly known as the ancestral seat of the Camaldolese monastic order, originated in the eponymous hermitage, which can still be visited. The name was derived from Tedald's diploma of 1027 in which he writes that the church is located "in loco qui dicitur Campo Malduli" - 'in a place which is named Maldolo's field'.

Overview
The Holy Hermitage and Monastery of Camaldoli is situated in an ancient forest in the Tuscan Apennines. It was founded about 1012 by Saint Romuald, a Benedictine monk, with the permission of Tedald, Bishop of Arezzo.

In the monastery of Camaldoli there is a welcoming room, a great hall, and an old style pharmacy. The pharmacy was originally a laboratory where monks studied and worked with medicinal herbs. These medicines would be used in the old hospital which can still be visited today. The precious walnut decor dates back to 1543. The church, meanwhile, was constructed in the Baroque style and contains works by Giorgio Vasari. It was established to deal with the ever-growing number of pilgrims - drawn by good reports of the monks, and for reflection in the middle of the forest.

A few kilometers farther up the mountain is the "Sacred Hermitage,"  or Sacro Eremo which is the more ancient part of the foundation. It was personally established by St. Romuald and has served as the heart of both the community and the order, which bears the location's name.

An important document of Political Catholicism in Italy, the Codice di Camaldoli, was drafted in the monastery in July, 1943.

External links
 Camaldoli - Camaldoli Ospitalità - Arezzo - Casentino - vacanze - case coloniche - arezzo - Camaldoli

References

On the medieval development, see:
 Daniel R. Curtis: Florence and its hinterlands in the late Middle Ages: contrasting fortunes in the Tuscan countryside, 1300-1500. In: Journal of Medieval History. Vol 38.4 (2012), pp. 472–499 (online).

Frazioni of the Province of Arezzo
Monasteries in Tuscany
Camaldolese monasteries in Italy
Benedictine monasteries in Italy